Christopher James Sainty (born 29 March 1967) is a British diplomat and civil servant. He is the current  British Ambassador to Portugal.

Early life and education
Sainty was born on 29 March 1967 in London, England, as the first son of Sir John Sainty and Lady Frances Sainty. He was educated at Westminster School, an all-boys public school attached to Westminster Abbey. He studied mathematics and philosophy at New College, Oxford, graduating with a Bachelor of Arts (BA) degree.

Career
Sainty entered the Foreign and Commonwealth Office (FCO) in 1989, beginning his career as a diplomat.

He was Deputy Head of Mission in The Hague from 2006 to 2008, and in Rome from August 2011 to August 2015. Since 1 October 2018, he has served as the British Ambassador to Portugal.

Personal life
Sainty is married to Sarah. Together they have three children: two daughters and a son.

References

Living people
Ambassadors of the United Kingdom to Portugal
21st-century British diplomats
1967 births
Diplomats from London
People educated at Westminster School, London
Alumni of New College, Oxford
Civil servants in the Foreign Office